The Thomas Haskins Gay House, at 704 Harding in Belle Fourche, South Dakota, was built in 1914.  Also known as the Gay-Frerich House, it was listed on the National Register of Historic Places in 1982.

It is a two-story "cube shape" house, built (with some modification) to a pattern book design from Radford American Homes, specifically Design No. 8361, which appeared in William A. Radford's "Cement Houses and How to Build Them", published c.1900-1910.

The property includes a carriage house.

References

Houses completed in 1914
National Register of Historic Places in Butte County, South Dakota
Houses on the National Register of Historic Places in South Dakota
Houses in Butte County, South Dakota